Paul Swanson (born 1932) is an American bridge player from Morgantown, West Virginia.  He is also the founder of Swanson Industries.

Bridge accomplishments

Awards

 Mott-Smith Trophy (1) 1972

Wins

 North American Bridge Championships (5)
 von Zedtwitz Life Master Pairs (1) 1973 
 Wernher Open Pairs (2) 1979, 1986 
 Mitchell Board-a-Match Teams (1) 1972 
 Chicago Mixed Board-a-Match (1) 1976

Runners-up

 North American Bridge Championships
 Wernher Open Pairs (1) 1978 
 Nail Life Master Open Pairs (1) 1980 
 Reisinger (3) 1963, 1973, 1980

Notes

External links

Living people
American contract bridge players
1932 births
Date of birth missing (living people)
Place of birth missing (living people)
People from Morgantown, West Virginia